Jormvattnet or Jorm is a village in Jämtland, in Strömsund Municipality, Jämtland County, Sweden. It overlooks a lake with islands, Lake Jormvattnet, and is overshadowed by a mountain, Jormliklumpen. It is a picturesque region and is used by tourists for horse riding and hiking. It had a population of 64 in 2005.

References 

Populated places in Strömsund Municipality
Jämtland